The Collection is a compilation album by British 2 Tone and ska band Bad Manners, released in the US on 10 March 1998.

Track listing
 "Skaville UK" 
 "Sally Brown"
 "Return of the Ugly"
 "Fatty Fatty"
 "Bonanza Ska"
 "Special Brew"
 "Just a Feeling" (live)
 "Lorraine" (live)
 "Walking in the Sunshine" (live)
 "Can Can" (live)
 "Lip Up Fatty" (live)
 "My Girl Lollipop" (live)

1998 compilation albums
Bad Manners albums
Cleopatra Records compilation albums